Jean-Baptiste-Charles-Mirampal Matthieu (3 October 1763, Compiègne31 October 1833, Condat, Gironde) was a French politician and Deputy to the National Convention.

He voted for the execution of Louis XVI.  On 4 September 1792, he was elected member of the Convention by the department of Oise.  Initially he was a moderate, despising the excesses of the Jacobins and directing his hostility toward Robespierre. On 26 May 1795, he was elected president of the Convention in a difficult position, just after the Uprising of 1 Prairial.

Bibliography 

 
 

1763 births
People from Compiègne
Regicides of Louis XVI
People on the Committee of Public Safety
Presidents of the National Convention
Deputies to the French National Convention
1833 deaths